Divoš is a village located in the Sremska Mitrovica municipality, in the Syrmia District of Serbia. It is situated in the autonomous province of Vojvodina. The village has a Serb ethnic majority and its population numbering 1,585 people (2002 census).

Name
In Serbian, the village is known as Divoš (Дивош) and in Hungarian as Diós.

Historical population

1961: 1,614
1971: 1,644
1981: 1,618
1991: 1,527

Culture

Near the village there is Kuveždin Monastery, one of 16 Orthodox monasteries on Fruška Gora mountain.

See also
List of places in Serbia
List of cities, towns and villages in Vojvodina

References
Slobodan Ćurčić, Broj stanovnika Vojvodine, Novi Sad, 1996.

External links 
 

Populated places in Syrmia
Sremska Mitrovica